Kunice may refer to places:

Czech Republic
Kunice (Blansko District), a municipality and village in the South Moravian Region
Kunice (Prague-East District), a municipality and village in the Central Bohemian Region

Serbia
Kunice (Valjevo), a settlement in the Valjevo municipality

Poland
Kunice, Lesser Poland Voivodeship (south Poland)
Kunice, Łódź Voivodeship (central Poland)
Kunice, Lower Silesian Voivodeship (south-west Poland)
Kunice, Słubice County in Lubusz Voivodeship (west Poland)
Kunice, Świętokrzyskie Voivodeship (south-central Poland)

See also